Courrier de Smyrne was Francophone newspaper of Izmir which was published from 1824 to 1905, usually twice a week. Successive editors were Alexandrer Blacque (1824), Reggio Gaston, in 1893 and Jules Regio in 1905. Besides politics, the newspaper contained commercial and literary issues, some of which can be found in the National Library of France.

Critique on Kapodistrias
Courrier de Smyrne guided by Alexandre Blacque, who spent his whole life trying to stop the expansion of the Russian Empire into the Dardanelles, exercised hostile critique of Ioannis Kapodistrias, considering him representative of Russian interests and accusing him of not working for the true interest of Greece, that he wanted to become king, that he imprisoned people without cause, etc.

References

Bibliography
Frazee, Charles A. (1969) The Orthodox Church and Independent Greece 1821-1852, CUP Archive.
Gilles Kraemer, 1995, Trois siècles de presse francophone dans le monde, l'Harmattan.

External links
Le Courrier de Smyrne, journal politique, commercial et litteraire, Volume 2
Le Courrier de Smyrne, journal politique, commercial et litteraire, Volume 3
Documents sur la presse turque au XIXe siècle, 1853 et 1857 (French)

French-language newspapers published in Ottoman Empire
Ottoman İzmir/Smyrna
1824 establishments in the Ottoman Empire
1905 disestablishments in the Ottoman Empire
Publications established in 1824
Publications disestablished in 1905
Defunct newspapers published in the Ottoman Empire